Cataulacus taprobanae is a species of ant of the subfamily Myrmicinae. It is a widespread species that can be found in Sri Lanka, India, and China.

References

External links

 at antwiki.org
Flicker.com
Animaldiversity.org

Myrmicinae
Hymenoptera of Asia
Insects described in 1853